Stacey Tappan (born June 13, 1973) is an American coloratura soprano.

Tappan was born in Boston, Massachusetts, and grew up in Pasadena, California. Both her parents are instrumental musicians.

She studied in the voice program at Chapman University (1991–1995) in Orange, California, the Manhattan School of Music (1995–1997), and Juilliard (1997–1999) in New York City. While at the Manhattan School and Juilliard, she studied with Cynthia Hoffmann.  Tappan continued her professional training in the Young Artist Program at Santa Fe Opera (1997), the University of Miami in Salzburg program (1998), the
Young Artist Program at Opera Theatre of Saint Louis (1999), Wolf Trap Opera Company (2000), and the Lyric Opera Center for American Artists (2001–2003) in Chicago.

She has sung as a soloist with The Metropolitan Opera, Chicago Lyric Opera, Houston Grand Opera, Bangkok Opera, Opera Theatre of Saint Louis, Wolf Trap Opera Company, Glimmerglass Opera, Glyndebourne Opera Festival, and many regional opera houses. She notably portrayed the role of Beth in the Houston Grand Opera's production of Mark Adamo's Little Women which was broadcast on PBS's Great Performances in 2001.

Partial discography
 Little Women: An Opera in Two Acts Ondine 2001

External references
 Stacey Tappan's website
 Lyric Opera Center for American Artists
 St. Louis Opera Theater
 Glimmerglass Opera

1973 births
Living people
Manhattan School of Music alumni
American operatic sopranos
Chapman University alumni
Musicians from Boston
Musicians from Pasadena, California
Singers from California
Juilliard School alumni
21st-century American singers
21st-century American women singers
Classical musicians from California
Classical musicians from Massachusetts